The 1998 Asian Men's Softball Championship was an international softball tournament which featured seven nations which was held in Manila, Philippines.

Participants

References

Asian Men's Softball Championship
International softball competitions hosted by the Philippines
1998 in Philippine sport